Cinémas Guzzo is a regional chain of movie theaters located in the Canadian province of Quebec. There are currently 10 Méga-Plex locations and 1 Cinema location, all within the greater Montreal area.

History
Cinemas Guzzo was started by Angelo Guzzo shortly after immigrating to Canada. He was born in Italy in 1946. In 1969, Vincenzo Guzzo was born and remains the Guzzo's only child. Vincenzo has had 5 children. After serving as the company's executive vice-president since 1990, as of 2018, Vincenzo took on the position of president.

In 2000, Cinemas Guzzo was identified as one of the 50 best managed private companies in Canada.

In 2001, revenues for the company were approximately $45 million, up roughly $5 million from the previous year. 2001 also saw an increase of nearly 500,000 tickets sold.

In 2007, they created the Guzzo Environment-Cancer Research Chair of the Cancer Research Society in partnership with the Université de Montréal. The following year, the first ever Notte in Bianco fundraising event took place, which raised roughly $400,000 in support of the fight against cancer.

In July 2012, Cinémas Guzzo completed their conversion of all their projectors to digital projectors. That same year, saw the opening of five IMAX screens at selected existing locations.

In late-2018, it was reported that Guzzo had been considering expanding his chain outside of Quebec, and had been investigating potential sites in Alberta and British Columbia, such as Calgary and Vancouver.

During the COVID-19 pandemic in Quebec in 2020, cinemas were forced to shut down from March 25 to July 2 in Quebec. Guzzo had hoped to remain open during the closure period, but that did not come to pass. After cinemas reopened, theatre capacity was reduced to prevent spread of SARS-CoV-2 infections leading to COVID-19, with enhanced sanitary and cleaning protocols. The 2020 season was threatened by the situation in the U.S. as American chains could not operate in many places, and American studios did not release films into the market due to the COVID and screenroom situation. Theatres were again closed on October 1 in Montreal, where Guzzo operates.

In 2021, as the COVID-19 pandemic continued, the Guzzo chain declined to reopen, as it believed that reopening restrictions were too strict and it refused to accept further government subsidies. The government imposed a provincial lockdown from December 26, 2020 to February 7, 2021, and later announced that cinemas across Quebec could reopen on February 26, 2021, with several restrictions. In red zones, where the Guzzo chain is located, this includes a 7:30 PM closing time and a ban on food and drinks during movies. Guzzo noted that no outbreaks have occurred in all of Canada through cinemas during 2020.

Cinema Mega-Plex Saint-Jean 12 is scheduled to open December 17, 2021, Cinemas Guzzo's 10th location.

Theatres

References

External links

Cinémas Guzzo MOBILE Website

Movie theatre chains in Canada
Companies based in Quebec
Terrebonne, Quebec
Cinemas and movie theatres in Quebec
Privately held companies of Canada
1974 establishments in Quebec